Hard Rock Hotel and Casino is a hotel and/or casino franchise.

Hard Rock Hotel or Hard Rock Casino may also refer to:

Buildings

United States
 Hard Rock Hotel at Universal Orlando, Florida
 Hard Rock Hotel and Casino (Biloxi), Mississippi
 Hard Rock Hotel and Casino (Las Vegas), Nevada
 Hard Rock Hotel and Casino (Stateline), Nevada
 Hard Rock Hotel & Casino Atlantic City, New Jersey
 Also the name of a once-planned but since-cancelled casino
 Hard Rock Hotel & Casino Sioux City, Iowa
 Hard Rock Rocksino Northfield Park, now MGM Northfield Park, Ohio
 Hard Rock Casino Cincinnati, Ohio
 Hard Rock Hotel & Casino Bristol, Virginia
 Seminole Hard Rock Hotel & Casino Hollywood, Florida
 Seminole Hard Rock Hotel and Casino Tampa, Florida

Elsewhere
 Hard Rock Casino Vancouver, British Columbia, Canada
 Hard Rock Hotel, at the City of Dreams, Macau, China
 Hard Rock Hotel Penang, Malaysia
 Hard Rock Hotel, at Resorts World Sentosa, Singapore

Other
 Hard Rock Casino (video game)

See also
 
 Hard Rock (disambiguation)